Joana Preiss (born 22 May 1972) is a French actress, director, singer, and performer.

Life and career
Joana Preiss has starred in the films of Christophe Honoré, Olivier Assayas, Nobuhiro Suwa and Pia Marais, and has also collaborated with Nan Goldin in her works. She has also worked with Ugo Rondinone, Dominique Gonzalez-Foerster and Céleste Boursier-Mougenot. She has performed on stage in the shows of Pascal Rambert and Eleanor Weber.

She was trained in classical singing and contemporary music, and regularly performs in concerts. She founded the duo White Tahina with Vincent Epplay, Hiroyuki, and Frédéric Danos, in which she sings poems by Hölderlin.

In 2011, she directed her first film Sibérie.

Filmography

Cinema
 1997 : Fin août, début septembre by Olivier Assayas
 1999 : La Ballade de l'amour by Nan Goldin
 2001 : Tout contre Léo by Christophe Honoré
 2002 : Roundelay by Ugo Rondinone
 2002 : La Guerre à Paris by Yolande Zauberman 
 2004 : Ma Mère by Christophe Honoré – Réa
 2004 : Clean by Olivier Assayas – Aline
 2005 : Un couple parfait by Nobuhiro Suwa
 2006 : Noise by Olivier Assayas – herself
 2006 : Dans Paris by Christophe Honoré – Anna
 2006 : Paris je t'aime by Olivier Assayas
 2007 : Boarding Gate by Olivier Assayas – Lisa
 2007 : The Unpolished by Pia Marais
 2008 : LOL (Laughing Out Loud) by Lisa Azuelos – mother of Stéphane
 2010 : Complices by Frédéric Mermoud – mother of Rebecca
 2010 : Kataï (court-métrage) by Claire Doyon
 2011 : La Ligne blanche by Olivier Torres – Anna
 2012 : Sibérie by Joana Preiss
 2012 :  by 
 2012 : Bad Girl by Patrick Mille – Brigitte
 2012 : Cino, l'enfant qui traversa la montagne by Carlo Alberto Pinelli] - The shepherdess
 2012 : Casa dolce casa by Tonino De Bernardi
 2013 : Hotel de l'Univers de Tonino De Bernardi
 2013 : Passer l'hiver by Aurélia Barbet
 2014 : Jour et Nuit - Delle donne e degli uomini perduti de Tonino De Bernardi
 2014 : Portrait of the Artist by Antoine Barraud
 2015 : Le Dos rouge by Antoine Barraud – Barbara
 2016 : Raw by Julia Ducournau

Television
 2009 : L'une chante, l'autre aussi by Olivier Nicklaus – herself

References

External links

1972 births
Living people
20th-century French actresses
21st-century French actresses
French film actresses
French women film directors
French women screenwriters
French screenwriters